The 2000 Delaware gubernatorial election was held on November 7, 2000, coinciding with the U.S. presidential election. Incumbent Governor Tom Carper was term-limited and instead successfully ran for the United States Senate. Lieutenant Governor and Democratic nominee Ruth Ann Minner squared off against Republican nominee John M. Burris and won in a landslide on election day.

Primaries

Democratic Party
Ruth Ann Minner, Lieutenant Governor of Delaware

Republican Party
John M. Burris, former state Chamber of Commerce President and 1984 Republican nominee for the United States Senate
Bill Lee, former Delaware Superior Court Justice

Independent Party of Delaware
Floyd E. McDowell

Campaign

Debates
Complete video of debate, October 17, 2000
Complete video of debate, October 23, 2000

Results

References

2000
Delaware
Gubernatorial